Holyrood may refer to:

Religion
Holyrood (cross), a Christian relic alleged to be part of the True Cross on which Jesus died
Feast of the Cross, or Holy Rood day, in the Christian liturgical calendar

Places

United Kingdom
 Holyrood, Edinburgh, an area of Edinburgh, Scotland
 Holyrood, a metonym for the Scottish Parliament or the Scottish Parliament Building
 Holyrood Abbey, a ruined Augustinian abbey in Edinburgh
 Holyrood Palace, formally the Palace of Holyroodhouse, Edinburgh
 Holyrood Park, a royal park in central Edinburgh
 Holyrood Academy, Chard, Somerset, England
 Holyrood estate, Southampton, England
 Holyrood Secondary School, a school in Glasgow, Scotland

Canada
 Holyrood, Newfoundland and Labrador
 Holyrood Thermal Generating Station, Conception Bay, Newfoundland
 Holyrood, Edmonton, Alberta
 Holyrood Elementary School
 Holyrood stop, a tram stop 
 Holyrood, Huron-Kinloss, Ontario

United States
 Holyrood, Kansas
 Holy Rood Cemetery, Washington, D.C.
 Cemetery of the Holy Rood, Westbury, New York

Other uses
 "Holyrood", the march of the RAF Regiment
 Holyrood (magazine), a Scottish current affairs and politics magazine

See also

Holy Rood Church (disambiguation)
Hollywood (disambiguation)
Rood (Scots), a land measurement of Anglo-Saxon origin